Xiahou Hui (211 – May or June 234?), courtesy name Yuanrong, formally known as Empress Jinghuai, was a noble lady of the state of Cao Wei during the Three Kingdoms period of China. She was a clever adviser to Sima Shi; it is said that she was poisoned by her husband due to conflicting loyalties.

Life
Xiahou Hui was a daughter of Xiahou Shang, a military general of the Cao Wei state in the Three Kingdoms period. Her mother was the Lady of Deyang District (德陽鄉主), a sister of the Wei general Cao Zhen; her full brother was Xiahou Xuan. At some point, she married Sima Shi, who would eventually become the regent of the Cao Wei state from 251 to 255. She bore Sima Shi five daughters but no sons. She was an elegant and intelligent woman who helped Sima Shi with his scholarship and his strategies. However, she eventually realised that her husband was not loyal to Wei; Sima Shi too became wary of her, due to her familial ties with the royal Cao clan of Wei. In 234, Xiahou Hui died after being poisoned. 

After the Jin dynasty replaced the Cao Wei state, the first Jin ruler Sima Yan (Emperor Wu), a nephew of Sima Shi, honoured Xiahou Hui with the posthumous title "Empress Jinghuai" to match Sima Shi's posthumous title of "Emperor Jing".

See also
 Lists of people of the Three Kingdoms
 Family tree of Sima Yi#Sima Shi

References

 Fang, Xuanling (ed.) (648). Book of Jin (Jin Shu).

211 births
234 deaths
People of Cao Wei
Jin dynasty (266–420) posthumous empresses
3rd-century Chinese women